Andrew Lawson (1861–1952) was a professor of geology at the University of California, Berkeley.

Andrew Lawson may also refer to:
 Andrew Lawson (cricketer) (born 1967), South African cricketer
 Andrew Lawson (Australian politician) (1873–?), Australian politician in the Tasmanian Legislative Council 
 Andrew Lawson (motorcyclist) (born 1993), motorcycle racer from Australia
 Andrew Lawson (photographer) (born 1945), British photographer, artist and author
 Andrew Lawson (singer)
 Andrew Lawson (MP) (1800–1853), British Conservative politician